Aleksandr Usov (born 2 March 1976) is a Russian sprinter who specializes in the 400 metres.

Usov won the silver medal in 4 x 400 metres relay at the 2004 World Indoor Championships, together with teammates Dmitriy Forshev, Boris Gorban and Andrey Rudnitskiy. The next year, the relay team won the bronze medal at the European Indoor Championships with Andrey Polukeyev, Usov, Forshev and Aleksandr Broshchenko.

His personal best time is 46.28 seconds, achieved in May 2003 in Tula.

See also
List of European Athletics Indoor Championships medalists (men)

External links 

1976 births
Living people
Russian male sprinters
World Athletics Championships athletes for Russia
World Athletics Indoor Championships medalists
21st-century Russian people